Mitracarpus is a plant genus in the coffee family Rubiaceae. Girdlepod is a common name for some species in this genus.

Species
The Plant List and the World Checklist of Selected Plant Families recognise 64 accepted species:
 Mitracarpus acunae  
 Mitracarpus albomarginatus  
 Mitracarpus anthospermoides  
 Mitracarpus aristatus  
 Mitracarpus bacigalupoae  
 Mitracarpus bahorucanus  
 Mitracarpus bakeri  
 Mitracarpus baturitensis  
 Mitracarpus bicrucis  
 Mitracarpus brachystigma  
 Mitracarpus brasiliensis  
 Mitracarpus breviflorus  
 Mitracarpus brevis  
 Mitracarpus buiquensis  
 Mitracarpus capitatus  
 Mitracarpus carnosus  
 Mitracarpus christii  
 Mitracarpus crassifolius  
 Mitracarpus decumbens  
 Mitracarpus depauperatus  
 Mitracarpus diodioides  
 Mitracarpus diversifolius  
 Mitracarpus eichleri  
 Mitracarpus eitenii  
 Mitracarpus eritrichoides  
 Mitracarpus falcatus  
 Mitracarpus filipes  
 Mitracarpus fischeri  
 Mitracarpus flagellatus  
 Mitracarpus floribundus  
 Mitracarpus fortunii  
 Mitracarpus frigidus  
 Mitracarpus froesii  
 Mitracarpus glabrescens  
 Mitracarpus haitiensis  
 Mitracarpus hasslerianus  
 Mitracarpus hirtus  
 Mitracarpus laeteviridis  
 Mitracarpus lhotzkyanus  
 Mitracarpus linearifolius  
 Mitracarpus linearis  
 Mitracarpus longicalyx  
 Mitracarpus maxwelliae  
 Mitracarpus megapotamicus  
 Mitracarpus microspermus  
 Mitracarpus nitidus  
 Mitracarpus pallidus  
 Mitracarpus parvulus  
 Mitracarpus polycladus  
 Mitracarpus pusillus  
 Mitracarpus recurvatus  
 Mitracarpus rigidifolius  
 Mitracarpus rizzinianus  
 Mitracarpus robustus  
 Mitracarpus sagranus  
 Mitracarpus salzmannianus  
 Mitracarpus scaberulus  
 Mitracarpus schininianus  
 Mitracarpus schizangius  
 Mitracarpus squarrosus  
 Mitracarpus steyermarkii  
 Mitracarpus stylosus  
 Mitracarpus tenuis  
 Mitracarpus trichanthus

References

Spermacoceae
Rubiaceae genera